The Museum Tower is a high-rise office building located in the Government Center district of Downtown Miami, Florida, United States. As its name implies, the building is situated across the street from HistoryMiami (and the former Miami Art Museum), which are both part of the Miami Cultural Plaza. The visibility of Museum Tower from I-95 provides it a valuable location.

The Museum Tower is used completely as class A office space.

References

Office buildings completed in 1986
Skyscraper office buildings in Miami
1986 establishments in Florida